Success Park 'n' Ride was a Transperth bus station located next to the current Cockburn Central Train/Bus Interchange. It was established on 21 March 1999 and decommissioned on 22 December 2007. After that it was superseded by its nearby station in Cockburn Central.

Bus routes
There were two bus routes travelling to Fremantle while three bus routes travelling to the Perth City via Kwinana Freeway and the rest of them serving the nearby suburbs around the bus station.
Stand 1
133 to Beeliar
134 to Beeliar
137 to Success
139 to Banjup
193 to Banjup
194 to Booragoon bus station via Murdoch Park 'n' Ride
612 Special event services
794 to Esplanade Busport via Kwinana Freeway

Stand 2
183 to Esplanade Busport via Kwinana Freeway & Murdoch Park 'n' Ride
193 to Esplanade Busport via Kwinana Freeway

Stand 3
136 to Fremantle station
510 to Fremantle station

Stand 4
183 to Aubin Grove
188 to Murdoch Park 'n' Ride

References

Bus stations in Perth, Western Australia
Former bus stations